The Nigerian Academy of Science Media Awards are media awards presented annually to recognize outstanding science reporting. . The award was founded in 2010 by the Nigerian Academy of Science to honor broadcast journalists and Newspaper columnist who published science-related articles, such as articles on health, technology and environment.
The award presentation is often attended by numerous media representatives, politicians, celebrities, journalists across the world. The most recent ceremony, honouring journalists in 2017, was held at Sheraton hotel, Mobolaji Bank Anthony way, Maryland, Lagos State, Nigeria on August 10, 2017.

Categories

Current categories
As of 2017, the Nigerian Academy of Science Media Awards have 2 categories. 
Some of these include:
Print Category: since 2010 
Broadcast Category: since 2010

References

Nigerian awards
Journalism awards